Waters' view (also known as the occipitomental view) is a radiographic view of the skull. It is commonly used to get a better view of the maxillary sinuses. An x-ray beam is angled at 45° to the orbitomeatal line. The rays pass from behind the head and are perpendicular to the radiographic plate. Another variation of the waters places the orbitomeatal line at a 37° angle to the image receptor. It is named after the American radiologist Charles Alexander Waters.

Uses

Structures observed 
Waters' view can be used to best visualise a number of structures in the skull.
 Maxillary sinuses.
 Frontal sinuses, seen with an oblique view.
 Ethmoidal cells.
 Sphenoid sinus, seen through the open mouth.
 Odontoid process, where if it is just below the mentum, it confirms adequate extension of the head.
The frontal sinus may not show the frontal sinus in detail.

Interpretation of results

Procedure 

Typically, the x-ray beam is angled at 45° to the orbitomeatal line. Another variation of the waters places the orbitomeatal line at a 37° angle to the image receptor, or 30°.

History 

Waters' view is named after the American radiologist Charles Alexander Waters. It is also known as the occipitomental view.

References 

Radiography
Radiology